Plotting is a  tile-matching puzzle video game published by Taito in 1989. It is called  in Japan as well as in versions for the Famicom and Game Boy, and Plotting in versions for the Atari ST, Amiga, Commodore 64, Amstrad CPC, GX4000 and ZX Spectrum. The game bears strong graphical and some gameplay similarities to Puzznic.

Gameplay

Reception 
In Japan, Game Machine listed Plotting on their August 1, 1989 issue as being the eighth most-successful table arcade unit of the month. The game was ranked the 23rd best game of all time by Amiga Power.

Legacy
In 2005, Plotting was re-released for Xbox, PlayStation 2, and Microsoft Windows as part of Taito Legends. On May 6, 2022, it announced that the game would be re-released for the Nintendo Switch as part of the Arcade Archives series.

References

External links

1989 video games
Plotting
Plotting
Arcade video games
Plotting
Plotting
Game Boy games
Nintendo Entertainment System games
Nintendo Switch games
PlayStation 4 games
Tile-matching video games
Plotting
Taito arcade games
Video games developed in Japan
Multiplayer and single-player video games

Hamster Corporation games